Murray Deshawn "Duke" Mondy (born December 2, 1990) is an American professional basketball player. He played college basketball for the Oakland Golden Grizzlies where he led the National Collegiate Athletic Association (NCAA) Division I in steals per game during his junior season, averaging 3.03 steals per game.

High school career
Mondy attended Catholic Central High School in Grand Rapids, Michigan and was rated a two-star recruit by both Scout.com and Rivals.com. He received scholarship offers from Providence and Central Michigan.

College career
Mondy started his career at Providence before transferring to Oakland following his sophomore season. Mondy led the Big East Conference in steals his sophomore season and led The Summit League in steals his redshirt junior season. Oakland switched to the Horizon League prior to his senior season. If Mondy leads the Horizon League in steals, he will become the first player in NCAA history to lead three different conferences in steals.

Mondy majors in Integrative Studies at Oakland.

Freshman season
Mondy averaged 3.4 points, 2.0 rebounds and 1.2 assists per game as a true freshman at Providence. The team finished with a 12–19 record.

Sophomore season
During his last season at Providence, Mondy let the Big East in steals per game with 2.1. He averaged 7.7 points, 3.3 rebounds and 1.2 assists per game. He received the team's Marvin Barnes Defensive Player of the Year award.

Junior season
Mondy transferred to Oakland and was required to sit out a season due to NCAA transfer rules. He used his redshirt season during 2011–12 in order to have two years of eligibility remaining at Oakland.

During his redshirt junior season in 2012–13, Mondy led the NCAA Division I for steals per game, averaging 3.03. He also set the Oakland single season record with 100 steals.

Mondy was named The Summit League's Newcomer of the Year and All-League Second Team after leading the league in steals and assists per game (6.0). He was the conference Player of the Week on January 7, 2013 after averaging 14.5 points, 5.5 assists, 4.0 steals and 3.0 rebounds against Nebraska–Omaha and Alabama.

Senior season
Mondy and teammate Dante Williams were arrested the morning of November 14 on rape charges in Culver City, California. The Los Angeles County District Attorney declined to press charges due to a lack of evidence. Oakland conducted its own internal investigation and also determined that no crime was committed. The players were suspended for two games for violating curfew. Mondy missed three games total, against California, Gonzaga and Louisiana–Lafayette.

Mondy set a career high for steals in a game against Indiana team with seven. He matched that total in his next game against No. 5 Michigan State.

Mondy sprained the MCL in his knee December 22 against Robert Morris. He was expected to miss one to four weeks of games but only missed the team's next game against .

In the January 26, 2014, game against Illinois–Chicago, Mondy made a three-point field goal at the buzzer to give Oakland a 76–75 win. Mondy received the inbounds pass under his own basket with 4.4 seconds on the clock. He dribbled the length of the court before hitting the pull up shot. Officials reviewed video of the play for approximately five minutes to determine if his foot was on the three-point line before confirming the attempt was indeed a three-pointer.

Statistics

Bold italics indicates led NCAA Division I

Professional career

D-League
On November 1, 2014, Mondy was selected by the Rio Grande Valley Vipers in the fourth round the 2014 NBA Development League Draft. However, he was later waived by the Vipers on November 14 prior to the start of the regular season.

After sitting out the 2014–15 season, Mondy again entered the NBA Development League draft, this time being selected by the Westchester Knicks in the sixth round of the 2015 edition. He again failed to make the team's final roster, getting cut by the Knicks on November 7.

Arantia Larochette
In 2016, Mondy signed with Luxembourgish club Arantia Larochette in the Total League.

Cape Breton Highlanders
In 2017, Mondy signed with Canadian club the Cape Breton Highlanders in NBL Canada.

NBA G League
On February 16, 2018, Mondy was acquired by the Texas Legends.

On October 23, 2021, Mondy signed with the Memphis Hustle. He did not make the final roster.

Career statistics

Domestic Leagues

Regular season

|-
| 2016–17
| style="text-align:left;"| Arantia Larochette
| align=left | Total League
| 18 ||  || 37.3 || .461 || .410 || .837 || 5.4 || 5.3 || 3.0 || 0.1 || 22.5
|-

|}

References

External links
 Oakland Golden Grizzlies bio

1990 births
Living people
American expatriate basketball people in Canada
American expatriate basketball people in Luxembourg
American expatriate basketball people in Mexico
American men's basketball players
Basketball players from Grand Rapids, Michigan
Cape Breton Highlanders (basketball) players
Oakland Golden Grizzlies men's basketball players
Ostioneros de Guaymas (basketball) players
Point guards
Providence Friars men's basketball players
Shooting guards
Sioux Falls Skyforce players
Texas Legends players